Mezno is a municipality and village in Benešov District in the Central Bohemian Region of the Czech Republic. It has about 400 inhabitants.

Administrative parts
Villages and hamlets of Lažany, Mitrovice, Stupčice and Vestec are administrative parts of Mezno.

References

Villages in Benešov District